Events from the year 1798 in Germany.

Incumbents

Holy Roman Empire 
 Francis II (5 July 17926 August 1806)

Important Electors
 Bavaria- Charles I (30 December 1777 – 16 February 1799)
 Saxony- Frederick Augustus I (17 December 176320 December 1806)

Kingdoms 
 Kingdom of Prussia
 Monarch – Frederick William III of Prussia (16 November 17977 June 1840)

Grand duchies 
 Grand Duke of Mecklenburg-Schwerin
 Frederick Francis I– (24 April 17851 February 1837)
 Grand Duke of Mecklenburg-Strelitz
 Charles II (2 June 17946 November 1816)
 Grand Duke of Oldenburg
 Wilhelm (6 July 17852 July 1823) Due to mental illness, Wilhelm was duke in name only, with his cousin Peter, Prince-Bishop of Lübeck, acting as regent throughout his entire reign.
 Peter I (2 July 182321 May 1829)
 Grand Duke of Saxe-Weimar
 Karl August  (1758–1809) Raised to grand duchy in 1809

Principalities 
 Schaumburg-Lippe
 George William (13 February 17871860)
 Schwarzburg-Rudolstadt
 Louis Frederick II (13 April 179328 April 1807)
 Schwarzburg-Sondershausen
 Günther Friedrich Karl I (14 October 179419 August 1835)
 Principality of Reuss-Greiz
 Heinrich XI, Prince Reuss of Greiz (12 May 1778 – 28 June 1800)
 Waldeck and Pyrmont
 Friedrich Karl August  (29 August 176324 September 1812)

Duchies 
 Duke of Anhalt-Dessau
 Leopold III (16 December 17519 August 1817)
 Duke of Saxe-Altenburg
 Duke of Saxe-Hildburghausen (1780–1826)  - Frederick
 Duke of Saxe-Coburg-Saalfeld
 Ernest Frederick, Duke of Saxe-Coburg-Saalfeld (16 September 1764 – 8 September 1800)
 Duke of Saxe-Meiningen
 Georg I (1782–1803)
 Duke of Schleswig-Holstein-Sonderburg-Beck
 Frederick Charles Louis (24 February 177525 March 1816)
 Duke of Württemberg
 Frederick I (22 December 179730 October 1816)

Other
 Landgrave of Hesse-Darmstadt
 Louis I (6 April 179014 August 1806)

Events 

 Building of the first major example of Egyptian Revival architecture, Karlsruhe Synagogue in Baden, designed by Friedrich Weinbrenner.
 Friedrich von Schiller – Wallensteins Lager
12 October – The rebuilt Weimarer Hoftheater are inaugurated with the first performance of the first part of Friedrich Schiller's dramatic trilogy Wallenstein: Das Lager (The Camp), directed by Goethe.
 Caroline von Wolzogen (anonymously) – Agnes von Lilien (first complete book publication, in 2 vols)
 Francis Lathom – The Midnight Bell: a German story, founded on incidents in real life
 Cassella chemical and pharmaceutical company founded
 M. M. Warburg & Co. bank founded

Births 

25 March – Christoph Gudermann, German mathematician (d. 1852)
30 March – Luise Hensel, German religious author and poet (died 1876)
2 April – August Heinrich Hoffmann von Fallersleben, German writer (d. 1874)
11 September – Franz Ernst Neumann, German mineralogist, physicist and mathematician (d. 1895)

Deaths 
20 January – Christian Cannabich, German musician and composer (born 1731)
11 April – Karl Wilhelm Ramler, German poet (b. 1725)
29 April – Nikolaus Poda von Neuhaus, German entomologist (b. 1723)
25 May – Asmus Jacob Carstens, Danish-German (born 1754)
20 November – Friedrich Fleischmann, composer (born 1766)

References 

Years of the 18th century in Germany
 
Germany
Germany